Jeffrey John (born 6 June 1992) is a French sprinter. He competed in the 200 metres event at the 2015 World Championships in Athletics in Beijing, China.

Competition record

References

External links
 
 
 

1992 births
Living people
French male sprinters
World Athletics Championships athletes for France
Place of birth missing (living people)
Universiade medalists in athletics (track and field)
Universiade gold medalists for France
Medalists at the 2017 Summer Universiade
20th-century French people
21st-century French people